Natalya Kurbatova (born 17 October 1985) is a Russian long-distance runner who specializes in marathon races.

She finished thirteenth at the 2006 World Road Running Championships, helping the Russian team take a fifth place in the team competition.

Her personal best time in the half marathon is 1:11:05 hours, achieved in September 2006 in Saransk. In the marathon she has 2:33:43 hours, achieved in June 2006 in Saransk.

References

1985 births
Living people
Russian female long-distance runners
Russian female marathon runners
20th-century Russian women
21st-century Russian women